Hatice Duman (born 12 August 1994) is a Turkish female para table tennis player of class 3 and Paralympian. She is a native of Balıkesir, Turkey.

Duman won the bronze medal at the 2012 International Para Table Tennis Tournament in Germany. She took the bronze medal in the Individual C3 event of the 2014 World Para Table Tennis Championships in Beijing, China. She became bronze medalist at the 2017 European Para Table Tennis Championships in Laško, Slovenia. She won the bronze medal at the 2018 International Tournament in  Laško, Slovenia. At the 2019 International Para Table Tennis Tournament held in Amman, Jordan, she took the bronze medal.

She participated at the 2012 and 2016 Paralympics. She obtained a quota for the 2020 Paralympics.

References

1994 births
Living people
Sportspeople from Balıkesir
Turkish female table tennis players
Paralympic table tennis players of Turkey
Table tennis players at the 2012 Summer Paralympics
Table tennis players at the 2016 Summer Paralympics
Table tennis players at the 2020 Summer Paralympics
People with paraplegia
21st-century Turkish sportswomen